Croke may refer to:

People
Croke (surname)

Places
 Croke Park, Gaelic Athletic Association Stadium in Dublin, Ireland
 Croke Township, Minnesota, a hamlet in Traverse County, Minnesota, United States

Other
Croke, alien race in Star Wars - see List of Star Wars races (A-E)